Miyan may refer to:
 Miyan (title), a royal title of the Indian subcontinent
 Miyan people, an ethnic group of Australia
 Miyan language, a language of Australia
 Mian, Punjab, a village in India

See also 
 
 Mian (disambiguation)

Language and nationality disambiguation pages